Claudia Iglesias de la Cruz (born 30 August 2003), most commonly known as Bicho, is a Spanish footballer who plays as a midfielder for Villarreal playing in the Primera División.

Club career
Bicho started her career at Atlético Madrid's academy.

References

External links
Profile at La Liga

2003 births
Living people
Women's association football midfielders
Spanish women's footballers
Footballers from Madrid
Atlético Madrid Femenino players
Primera División (women) players
Segunda Federación (women) players
21st-century Spanish women